Statistics of the V-League in the 1998 season.

Standings
Champions: The Cong (18th)
Runners-Up: Song Lam Nghe An  
Third: Cong An  
Fifth: Cang Saigon 
Other teams in first division include: Cong An (Hanoi) and Cong An (Haiphong).
Relegated: Hai Quan, (Ho Chi Minh City)

References
1998 V-League at RSSSF

Vietnamese Super League seasons
Viet
Viet
1